Kuzmin is a village (selo) in central Ukraine. It is located in Khmelnytskyi Raion (district) of Khmelnytskyi Oblast (province). Kuzmyn belongs to Shchyborivka rural hromada, one of the hromadas of Ukraine. 

Until 18 July 2020, Kuzmyn was the administrative center of Krasyliv Raion. The raion was abolished in July 2020 as part of the administrative reform of Ukraine, which reduced the number of raions of Khmelnytskyi Oblast to three. The area of Krasyliv Raion was merged into Khmelnytskyi Raion.

Administration

References

External links
JewishGen Locality Page - Kuzmin, Ukraine (requires free login)

Volhynian Governorate

Villages in Khmelnytskyi Raion